Andrew Leonard (born 1962) is an American journalist who writes feature articles for San Francisco and contributes to Medium. From 1995 to 2014 he wrote for Salon.com. He has also written for Wired.

Career
Leonard is credited with coining the term "open-source journalism". He is the author of Bots: The Origin of New Species, which The New York Times called a "playful social history of the internet". According to Christopher Lehmann-Haupt, also writing in the Times, the book is "deceptively profound". Bots was one of the first few books published by Wired's nonfiction publishing venture HardWired, launched in 1996.

For six years as a financial analyst for Salon.com, Leonard wrote a blog, How the World Works, covering topics such as speculation in the car market, the Bankruptcy Abuse Prevention and Consumer Protection Act, and immigration reform.

Leonard is the son of the American literary, television, film, and cultural critic John Leonard.

Selected works

References

External links 
 Salon page for Andrew Leonard

Living people
1962 births
Salon (website) people
American magazine journalists
American technology writers
American business writers
Place of birth missing (living people)
American speculative fiction critics
Science fiction critics
American literary critics